Executive Decision is a 1996 American action film directed by Stuart Baird in his directorial debut. It stars Kurt Russell, Steven Seagal, Halle Berry, John Leguizamo, Oliver Platt, Joe Morton, David Suchet and B.D. Wong. It depicts the rescue of an airliner hijacked by terrorists, by a small team placed on the plane in mid-flight. The film was released in the United States on March 15, 1996 and grossed $122 million against a $55 million budget.

Plot 
Lieutenant Colonel Austin Travis leads an unsuccessful Special Forces black ops raid on a Chechen mafia safe house in Trieste, Italy, to recover a stolen Soviet nerve agent, DZ-5. Three months later, Oceanic Airlines Flight 343, a Boeing 747-200, leaves Athens bound for Washington, D.C., with over 400 passengers aboard including Nagi Hassan, lieutenant of the imprisoned terrorist leader El Sayed Jaffa. Hassan and his men hijack the flight, demanding Jaffa's release. Meanwhile, just moments before the hijacking, a suicide bomber working for Jaffa destroys a London Marriott hotel restaurant.

Dr. David Grant, the U.S. Army intelligence consultant behind the botched raid, is summoned to a meeting at the Pentagon to plan an operation to retake the plane. Grant doubts Hassan's demands, suspecting he engineered Jaffa's capture, and intends to use the 747 to detonate a bomb loaded with the DZ-5 in U.S. airspace. The Pentagon authorizes a mid-air insertion of Travis' special operations team onto the hijacked airliner using the experimental "Remora F117x" aircraft. Grant and DARPA engineer Dennis Cahill reluctantly join the mission.

The Remora intercepts and docks with the airliner. Grant, Cahill, and team members Cappy, Baker, Louie and Rat successfully board but Cappy is injured after a fall. Severe turbulence strains the docking tunnel. Travis sacrifices himself by closing the 747's hatch before it decompresses. The Remora is destroyed along with the team's communications equipment, leaving the Pentagon unaware of their survival. They conduct a covert search for the bomb, hoping to neutralize it and storm the cabin. Grant accidentally reveals who he is to flight attendant Jean, but successfully recruits her to assist their search, despite Hassan's suspicions.

The team locates the bomb and Cappy, despite his injuries, guides Cahill in disarming it until they discover its arming device has an additional, remote-controlled trigger. Jaffa, released by U.S officials in an attempt to resolve the situation, calls Hassan from a private jet to tell him he is on his way to Algeria, but Hassan abruptly ends the call. Grant and the others realize Hassan's men are unaware of the bomb and Hassan's true intentions, after he kills one of them for rebuking him. He also inadvertently reveals that one of the passengers is a sleeper agent and the trigger-man for the bomb.

The Pentagon dispatches U.S. Navy F-14 Tomcats to shoot down the 747, prompting Hassan to execute U.S. Senator Mavros (a passenger) as a warning.  Baker uses Morse code via the 747's taillights to signal the fighters that the team made it aboard, requesting an extra ten minutes to neutralize the bomb and retake the 747, despite already crossing into U.S. airspace. Jean spots a man with an electronic device and informs Grant, who enters the passenger cabin to take the suspected individual by surprise, only to find he is merely a diamond thief. Grant spots the real sleeper, Demou, and fights him for the detonator. Hassan attempts to shoot Grant, but is himself shot by an on-board air marshal.

The commandos storm the cabin as a firefight ensues. Grant struggles to wrestle the detonator from Demou's grip while Baker and Rat gun-down several terrorists. Louie assists Grant by fatally shooting Demou and eliminating the remaining terrorists. Demou, however, manages to arm the bomb before dying, and stray bullets from a terrorist's weapon pierce a window causing explosive decompression. The bomb is disarmed just in time by Cappy and Cahill as the 747 stabilizes. Hassan kills the pilots and damages the controls, before being shot and killed by Rat.

Despite his limited flying experience and poor flying technique, Grant takes control of the 747 and attempts a landing but misses the approach to Dulles International Airport. Grant recognizes the area surrounding his training airfield, Frederick Field and attempts to land the 747 there. With Jean's assistance, Grant successfully lands the airliner and the passengers are safely evacuated. Grant is saluted by Baker, Louie, Rat and Cappy for his leadership before being summoned to the Pentagon.

Cast

Production
Steven Seagal says that he was enticed to accept the unusual role of Austin Travis by a hefty salary, which amounted to around a million dollars per day spent on the shoot. He also found some satisfaction in knowing that his character's unexpected fate would shock the audience, and therefore did not regret taking the role.

Reception

Critical response
On Rotten Tomatoes the film has an approval rating of 63% based on reviews from 41 critics, with an average rating of 6.30/10. The site's consensus states: "Executive Decision adheres entertainingly to classic action thriller formula, proving a genre outing doesn't need to win points for originality to be solidly effective." On Metacritic the film has an approval rating of 62 out of 100, based on reviews from 20 critics. Audiences polled by CinemaScore gave the film an average grade of "A−" on an A+ to F scale.

Leonard Maltin called it "a tense, inventive thriller" which needed more editing.  Leonard Klady of Variety wrote, "The picture's logic may be a bit fast and loose, but its action-and-excitement quotient is top-notch."  Roger Ebert rated it 3 out of 4 stars, calling it "a gloriously goofy mess of a movie" with several plot holes (e.g. smuggling a toxin into the country would likely be easier and just as effective as hijacking). Ebert praised the first-act plot twist of killing off the character played by Seagal, then a major Hollywood star: "I perked right up".

Accolades
Halle Berry earned a Blockbuster Entertainment Award for Favorite Actress - Adventure/Drama for her performance in the film in 1997.

Steven Seagal earned a Razzie Award nomination for Worst Supporting Actor for his performance in the film but lost to Marlon Brando for The Island of Dr. Moreau.

Other versions 
The European theatrical version of the film was edited by the studio in order to remove reference to Islam. The original US version was the source of the DVD in that country, while the European version was used worldwide as the source for the Blu-ray HD master. This transfer was also used on the Netflix release in 2021, though the subtitles still reference Islam.

See also 

Ghost Squad, a 2004 arcade game from Sega that has a level set on Air Force One, similar to the plot of Executive Decision.

References

External links
 
 
 
 
 

1996 films
1996 action thriller films
1996 directorial debut films
1990s disaster films
American action thriller films
American aviation films
American disaster films
Films about aircraft hijackings
Films about jihadism
Films about aviation accidents or incidents
Films about terrorism in the United States
Films about the United States Navy
Films about United States Army Special Forces
Films directed by Stuart Baird
Films produced by Joel Silver
Films produced by Jim Thomas (screenwriter)
Films produced by John Thomas (screenwriter)
Films scored by Jerry Goldsmith
Films set on airplanes
Films set in Los Angeles
Films set in Washington, D.C.
Films shot in Mobile, Alabama
Films shot in Puerto Rico
Films with screenplays by Jim Thomas (screenwriter)
Films with screenplays by John Thomas (screenwriter)
Islamic terrorism in fiction
Silver Pictures films
Techno-thriller films
Warner Bros. films
1990s English-language films
1990s American films